Antena 3 Canarias was a Spanish television channel broadcasts to the Canary Islands and in Spanish, launched in 2008. It was founded and started to broadcast in 2008. The channel was closed on 1 April 2013 by own decision of Atresmedia because Supreme Court of Spain had upheld the invalidity of TDT licenses.

References

External links
Official Website

Defunct television channels in Spain
Television channels and stations established in 2008
Television channels and stations disestablished in 2013
Mass media in Santa Cruz de Tenerife